Balša Balšić; or Balsha II died September 18, 1385), known in historiography as Balša II, was the Lord of Lower Zeta from 1378 to 1385. He managed to expand his borders towards the south; defeating the Albanian duke Karl Thopia.
He was a member of the Balšić noble family, which ruled Zeta (with Scutari) from ca. 1362 to 1421.

Early life
Balša II was the youngest of three sons of Balša.  According to Mavro Orbini, Balša, the progenitor of the Balšić family, was a petty nobleman who held only one village in the area of Lake Skadar during the rule of Emperor Dušan the Mighty (r. 1331 to 1355). Only after the death of the emperor, during the subsequent weak rule of Emperor Uroš V, Balša together with his friends and his three sons (Stracimir, Đurađ and Balša II) gained power in Lower Zeta, which had previously been the lands of gospodin Žarko (fl. 1336 to 1360).  Balša's people then turned for Upper Zeta, which was held by Đuraš Ilijić and his relatives; the Balšić brothers murdered Đuraš, and had some of his relatives imprisoned. Balša died the same year. Orbini further described the personalities of the brothers, claiming that Balša II was "good-natured and an accomplished horseman, but not of great mind". The Balšići managed to elevate themselves from petty nobility to provincial lords, becoming powerful after 1362, and it seems that they had an active part in the conflict between Emperor Uroš V and Simeon Uroš in Skadar, helping Uroš V.

In January 1368, a Ragusan document reported that the three Balšić brothers: Stracimir, Đurađ and Balša II, were preparing for a campaign against Karlo Thopia. They were camped on the Mati River, of which Karlo's lands lay south of. The fighting was apparently small-scale as two months later, Karlo had no difficulty capturing Dyrrhachium from the Angevins. In 1372, Balša II married Komnina, the daughter of Alexander Komnenos Asen, Despot of Berat and Valona. As a dowry, Balša gained the cities of Valona, Berat and Kanina (in modern-day southern Albania), located in Asen's province.

Reign
On January 13, 1378, he came to power in Zeta after the death of his older brother, Đurađ I. His power was felt only in the region around Scutari and in the eastern part of Zeta's coast. The most prominent feudal lords who did not recognize Balša's rule were their sworn enemies, the Đurašević-Crnojević family, who were allies of the Republic of Venice.

In 1385, Balša II started the war for the conquest of Durazzo, taking it following four attempts. In 1385, the defeated ruler Karl Topia appealed to Murat I for assistance, and the Ottoman Army led by Hajruddin Pasha routed the Balšići at the Battle of Savra, on the Saurian field, near Lushnjë. The Ottomans chopped Balša's head off and sent it as an exclusive gift to Hajreddin Pasha. This marks the end of the rule of his family over Durazzo.

Aftermath
Balša's widow, Komnina, and their daughter Ruđina, later took control of Balša's territory in southern Albania to protect it from Turkish invaders. Komnina seemed to be the Duchy of Valona's main ruler, until her death in 1396. In the meantime, the Muzaka family had gained control of Berat. In 1391, however, Ruđina married Mrkša Žarković. Žarković succeeded the duchy, calling himself Lord of Valona. He reigned over the city until his death in 1414. Ruđina took over her late husband's position and ruled Valona until 1417, when it, as well as its citadel in Kanina, was seized by the Turks. Ruđina fled Albania and sought asylum in Zeta. Her nephew, Balša III, then-ruler of Zeta, granted her asylum and entrusted her with governorship of the coastal town of Budva.

Titles
His title was gospodin (lord), while after taking over Durazzo, he had the right to add the title of duke.

Note

References

Sources

External links

Lords of Zeta
Balšić noble family
1385 deaths
Year of birth unknown
People of the Serbian Empire